Scortecci's blind snake (Myriopholis braccianii), also known commonly as Bracciani's worm snake, is a species of snake in the family Leptotyphlopidae. The species is endemic to the Horn of Africa.

Etymology
The specific name, braccianii, is in honor of Italian explorer Luigi Bracciani.

Geographic range
M. braccianii is found in Eritrea, Ethiopia, Kenya, Somalia, and Sudan.

Habitat

Description
M . braccianii is a small species. The longest recorded specimen measures  in total length (including tail).

Reproduction
M. braccianii is oviparous.

References

Further reading
Adalsteinsson SA, Branch WR, Trape S, Vitt LJ, Hedges SB (2009). "Molecular phylogeny, classification, and biogeography of snakes of the family Leptotyphlopidae (Reptilia, Squamata)". Zootaxa 2244: 1-50. (Myriopholis braccianii, new combination).
Parker HW (1949). "The snakes of Somaliland and the Sokotra Islands". Zoologische Verhandelingen 6 (1): 1–115. (Leptotyphlops braccianii, new combination, p. 21).
Scortecci G (1929). "Rettili dell'Eritrea esistenti nelle Collezioni del Museo Civico di Milano ". Atti della Società di Scienze Naturali e del Museo Civico di Storia Naturale, Milano 67 (3-4): 290–339. (Glauconia braccianii, new species, p. 294). (in Italian). 
Spawls S, Howell K, Hinkel H, Menegon M (2018). Field Guide to East African Reptiles, Second Edition. London: Bloomsbury Natural History. 624 pp. . (Myriopholis braccianii, p. 373).

Myriopholis
Reptiles described in 1929